Alan Wake II is an upcoming survival horror game developed by Remedy Entertainment and published by Epic Games Publishing. A sequel to Alan Wake (2010), the game is set to be released for PlayStation 5, Windows, and Xbox Series X/S in 2023.

Development
Remedy Entertainment released Alan Wake in 2010. Remedy learnt from their lessons working on Max Payne and wrote Alan Wake in a way that allows additional story to be told through sequels and additional installments. The team quickly began to discuss sequel ideas after Alan Wake was shipped. The sequel would continue to star Alan Wake as the protagonist, but it would also explore the stories of the supporting characters including Wake's friend Barry Wheeler and Sheriff Sarah Breaker. A prototype was created to show off the gameplay of Alan Wake 2 when the studio was showing the game to potential publishers. New enemies and new gameplay mechanics, such as being able to rewrite reality, was showcased in the prototype. Narratively, it will be a direct continuation of Alan Wake. Ultimately, Remedy pitched the project to Alan Wake publisher Microsoft Studios. Microsoft, however, at the time was not interested in a sequel and instead, tasked Remedy to create something new. This ultimately became Quantum Break, which was released in 2016. Most of the ideas for Alan Wake 2 were implemented in American Nightmare, a downloadable follow-up for the original Alan Wake game.

When Quantum Break was announced, Sam Lake explained that a sequel to Alan Wake had been postponed, and that Alan Wake was not financially successful enough to receive the funding they needed to continue developing the sequel at the time. Director of communications Thomas Puha stated in April 2019 that Remedy had briefly returned to work on an Alan Wake property about two years prior, but the effort did not work out, and the company is presently booked for the next few years, between their own new game Control, supporting Smilegate on its game Crossfire, and another new project. Puha said that the only limited factor for them to work on an Alan Wake sequel was "time, money, and resources". Despite that, Lake continued to be part of a team in Remedy to brainstorm ideas and work on different incarnations for Alan Wake II. Internally, the project was codenamed "Project Big Fish", which represented its importance and significance to Remedy. In the second downloadable content pack for Control, Remedy's next game following Quantum Break, Alan Wake was featured as a character. According to Remedy, Control established the "Remedy Connected Universe" which is shared by both Control and Alan Wake, and that the next game released by the studio will also be set on this universe.

In July 2018, Remedy CEO Tero Virtala stated that any further sequels to Alan Wake would require Microsoft Studios' approval as the publishing rights holder, though Remedy otherwise owns all other IP rights to the series. In 2021, it was announced that Remedy had signed with Epic Games Publishing for the release of two games. Remedy released Alan Wake Remastered in October 2021 as the first game of this partnership, while the triple-A game was revealed to be Alan Wake II when the game was officially announced at The Game Awards 2021.

According to Sam Lake, the game will be powered by Remedy's own Northlight Engine, which previously powered Quantum Break, Control, and Alan Wake Remastered. Lake also stated that Alan Wake II will be a survival horror game, as opposed to Alan Wake, which Lake said was "an action game with horror elements", though he did not explain the difference between the two. Lake further added that players will not need to play the previous games in order to understand Alan Wake II. Remedy confirmed the game will remain in the third-person perspective despite the switch to survival horror, and that both Ilkka Villi and Matthew Porretta will return to provide the appearance and the voice of Alan, respectively.

References

External links
 

Upcoming video games scheduled for 2023
Survival horror video games
Epic Games games
Windows games
PlayStation 5 games
Xbox Series X and Series S games
Remedy Entertainment games
Third-person shooters
Video games developed in Finland
Video game sequels
Video games about the paranormal